HMNZS Arabis was a modified  of the Royal New Zealand Navy (RNZN). Built for the British Royal Navy as HMS Arabis, she was transferred to the RNZN on completion. She was commissioned in 1944 and decommissioned in 1948.

After a refit, Arabis sailed for the Solomons, arriving at Renard Sound on 14 December 1944 where her captain took over as senior officer, 25th Minesweeper Flotilla, from Matai. She returned to Auckland on 20 June 1945. Two voyages to Nouméa followed in July 1945 to escort with Tui the twelve RNZN Fairmiles back home to Auckland.

Fate
Arabis was decommissioned in 1948, and broken up for scrap in 1951.

See also
Corvettes of the Royal New Zealand Navy

References
Walters, Sydney David (1956) The Royal New Zealand Navy: Official History of World War II, Department of Internal Affairs, Wellington Online
McDougall, R J  (1989) New Zealand Naval Vessels. Page 49–51. Government Printing Office. 

Flower-class corvettes of the Royal New Zealand Navy
Ships built on the River Clyde
1944 ships